Baratie may refer to:

 Bărăţia (disambiguation)
 A story arc in One Piece